Chackoyum Maryyum, ചാക്കോയും മേരിയും(transl. Chacko And Mary) is an Indian Malayalam television series being premiered on Mazhavil Manorama since 21 October 2019.

Synopsis
The life of Kuriachan, who lives with his wife and children, takes a drastic turn when Rajalakshmi entrusts him with Chacko, her illegitimate son. He is the son of Raja Lakshmi and her secret boyfriend. Right before her wedding, Raja Lakshmi requests her childhood friend Kuriyachan to take care Chakko for some time. Kuriyachan, who is the father of three kids, agrees to take care of the baby boy. Gradually, Kuriyachan realises that he was tricked by Raja Lakshmi and ended up being the caretaker of little Chakko.

Cast
Lead Cast
Akash Mahesh / Sajin John as Chacko
Illegitimate son of Rajalekshmi and Gautam, raised by Kuriachan and Alice
VK Baiju as Kuriachan
Foster father of Chacko
Monisha Arshak as Neelambari
Care taker and lover of Chacko
Neena Kurup as Alice
Kuriachan's wife
Aparnadevi as Mary
Neerada Sheen as Sandra IPS
Neelima Rani / Devi Ajith as Rajalekshmi
Chacko's biological mother
Arjun S Kulathingal/Mithun as Xavier
Elder Son of Kuriachan and Alice
Archana Suseelan as Jiny
Xavier's wife
Ajoobsha as Sunny
Younger son of Kuriachan and Alice
Balachandran Chullikkadu as Sharmaji
Rajalakshmi's right-hand man
Joemon Joshy as Alen
 Elsa's College Lecturer
 Recurring Cast
___ as Mariya
Chilanka S Deedu as Elsa
Tony as Adv.Mohanachandran
Vijayalakshmi
Rajesh Hebbar as Chandrasenan
Bindu Ramakrishnan as Chandrasenan's mother
Divya M Nair as Treesa
Rohit as Gautam
E.K.Rajendran as Varkkichan
Kottayam Manju  as Lissy
_ as Baby
Anzil Rehman as Jomy
Deepika Mohan as Sreedevi (Rajalakshmi's Mother)
Saniya Babu as Elsa
Amith as Aravindan
_ as Gayathri
Harisree Martin as Street singer
Jolly Easow as Aalungal Ammachi (Cathrine Amma)
Lissy Jose as Tresia Chedathi
 as Xavier
Santhakumari as Eliyamma
Sajna Firoz
Baby Megha Mahesh as Sara

References

2019 Indian television series debuts
Malayalam-language television shows
Mazhavil Manorama original programming